Angel's Suitcase is an album by Zhao Wei. It marks the release of the first album by independent music studio MBOX. Wei directed the music video of the title track.

Track listings

Accolades

External links
Soundunwound.com
Sina.com Official Page
Sohu.com Official Page

References

2007 albums
Zhao Wei albums